John Edwin Bunnell (born May 25, 1944) is a former American sheriff of Multnomah County, Oregon. Bunnell is best known for presenting World's Wildest Police Videos between 1998 and 2001 and its revival briefly in 2012.

Background
Bunnell was born in Pendleton, Oregon. He obtained a degree in social sciences before joining the Multnomah County Sheriff's Department in January 1969. Bunnell managed the drugs and vice unit in the 1980s. Between 1989 and 1990, Multnomah County's Sheriff's Office was featured in 15 episodes of COPS and in 1991, 13 episodes of American Detective, which he also hosted. He was appointed Sheriff of Multnomah County when the previous sheriff, Robert G. Skipper, retired in 1994 before the end of his term. Bunnell took the oath of office on November 30, 1994 and served until May 1995. In the spring of 1995, Bunnell ran against Dan Noelle for Multnomah County Sheriff, losing the election to Noelle, who assumed office in June, 1995.

He is usually referred to as "Sheriff John Bunnell" despite no longer being active in law enforcement; this is occasionally shown as "Sheriff John Bunnell [Ret]".

His son, Mark, is a corrections deputy with the Multnomah County Sheriff's Office and was first seen with his father on an episode of COPS as a teenager back in 1989. His COPS segments involved drug crimes as seen in this video.

Media appearances
His appearances on several early episodes of COPS conducting drug stings led to him hosting World's Wildest Police Videos. Bunnell attained a cult following due to his over-the-top commentary style. Bunnell hosted the show, which originally ran from 1998 to 2001 and again since 2012, describing situations featured on the program as they developed and offering personal opinions about the criminals and the police that pursued them using cliches', innuendos and double meanings such as "This man decided to rob a bank. Now he'll learn crime doesn't pay". Bunnell's hosting of World's Wildest Police Videos led to him hosting a similar show, Train Wrecks, as well as many other police related specials, such as World's Scariest Police Stings and  World's Craziest Police Chases. He also appeared on America's Most Wanted. Bunnell lends his voice to the Sony PlayStation game World's Scariest Police Chases, warning, "Due to the graphic nature of this game, player discretion is advised," similar to the warning at the beginning of the counterpart television program. He has also had minor acting roles in Ghost World and  Bad Santa, both directed by Terry Zwigoff. In "Quagmire's Baby" and "Something, Something, Something, Dark Side", both 2009 episodes of Family Guy, Bunnell provided the voice of himself during gags that referenced World's Wildest Police Videos. In 2010, Bunnell appeared on commercials for the Adult Swim Block Party.

See also
C. W. Jensen

References

External links

Multnomah County Sheriff's Office

People from Pendleton, Oregon
Oregon sheriffs
1944 births
Living people
American television personalities
Male television personalities
People from Multnomah County, Oregon